Huang Biren (born 7 March 1969) is a Singaporean actress best known for appearing in numerous MediaCorp Channel 8 television dramas. She was prominently a full-time Mediacorp artiste from 1988 to 2008, but continues to film on an ad-hoc basis.

Huang left Mediacorp on 30 June 2008, due to the new contract terms offered to her and she also wanted to spend more time with her family, especially her 5-month-old infant girl.

Career
Huang joined the Singapore Broadcasting Corporation (now MediaCorp) in 1988 after completing its Professional Drama Performers' Training course. She was due to study at Hawaii Pacific University in the United States but chose to go into acting when SBC offered her a contract, much to the initial disappointment of her parents.

Having been in the industry for 10 years, Huang won her first Top 10 Most Popular Female Artistes award in Star Awards 1997. In 1998, Huang went on to star in the hit Chinese drama series Stand By Me, which recorded rocketing viewership ratings (defeating the high-profile series Return of the Condor Heroes), despite very little promotion done prior to the drama's telecast. She played a patient and caring wife of a paraplegic (played by Xie Shaoguang), which won her the Best Actress Award at the 1998 Star Awards. She was also the first Singaporean actress to receive a Best Actress nomination in the 1998 Asian Television Awards for Stand By Me. Her performance in this drama had touched the hearts of many audience – since then, she has become a household name for numerous Singaporeans.

Other award-winning lead roles other than the one in Stand By Me include Kelian, where she played an old-fashioned and cowardly woman who was always being abused by her mother in Beautiful Connection (2002), and Lucky, where she played a gambling addict in My Lucky Charm (2005). She, Ivy Lee and Chen Liping are the only actresses to be crowned Best Actress three times at the in-house Star Awards.

In 2003, Biren was nominated for the Best Drama Performance by an Actress award in the Asian Television Awards for her role in A Child's Hope. In the same year, Huang was listed in People at The Peak – The Who's Who of Singapore. Her name was once again listed in the second edition of the book, which was published in 2006. The books were sold globally.

Since 2005, Biren has filmed an average of only one serial per year, compared to three drama series per year between 2002 and 2004. Rumours circulated that she feigned illness so that she need not take up roles that did not cast her in good light. Biren came out strongly against these rumours and attributed the drop in drama serials filmed to an asthma attack she suffered after filming The Undisclosed, granting her medical leave for a period of a year. Another reason cited by the local media was the media merger which took place in December 2004, which led to less dramas produced as competition from SPH MediaWorks ceased to exist.

Biren did not film any serials in Year 2006. The suspense thriller The Undisclosed, which was telecast in 2006, was filmed in 2005. Instead, she ventured into hosting or appeared as a guest in various variety shows. Though her drama serials reduced significantly, Biren was still able to maintain her popularity levels, as attested by her popularity award wins at the Star Awards ceremonies.

In June 2007, Biren was chosen as one of the 10 TV mentors for the Star Search 2007 Reality Talent Show contestants. In the same year, she was again nominated for the Best Actress award in the Asian Television Awards (ATA) and Star Awards 2007 for her role as a fat, naggy and fierce housewife in Mars VS Venus. Though she did not manage to clinch both of the awards, she was tipped the hot favourite to win by many media, audience and industry watchers. After she lost the ATA Best Actress award to Filipino actress Gina Pareño, Biren spoke to reporters from Channel News Asia:

A nomination out of so many countries – you're talking about the whole of Asia – is already something to be proud of. So, I think it's already something that I feel is a great achievement.

In the Star Awards 25th Anniversary Show, Biren won the coveted My Favourite Actress Award, defeating hot favourites Zoe Tay and Fann Wong. She was the first female artiste to win this prestigious award, which was given out in commemoration of 25 Years of drama productions.

An interview conducted by 8 Days magazine in November 2007 stated that Huang had been the lead actress in seven of the eleven dramas with the annual highest viewership since 1997. (8 Days reference: 7 Nov)

Departure from MediaCorp
On 4 August 2008, MediaCorp released news that Huang has left the TV station on 30 June 2008. The main reasons for her leaving were disagreements with MediaCorp over the new contract terms offered to her; and she also wanted to spend more time with her family, especially her 5-month-old infant girl. She was last seen on television as a MediaCorp artiste on 11 July 2008, when she co-hosted an episode of Glamour Mum and the Dude alongside Bryan Wong. Huang was quoted as saying this to reporters,

I thought about it (whether to renew her contract) even when I was (about to sleep) in bed... But when the time came to make the decision, I had to be firm. (Reference: The New Paper)

Her decision to leave this industry was seen as a huge loss to MediaCorp Channel 8 by both the audience and the TV station, as her drama serials have consistently achieved high viewership ratings and her acting skills were recognised by many. After the news was released, forums were abuzz with numerous discussions about this issue, and many questioned if Biren would still be able to receive the coveted All Time Favourite Award (an award given out in accumulation for winning the Top 10 award 10 times). Paul Chan, MediaCorp's Vice-President for Branding and Promotions, answered the query by saying that the company has not decided if Biren will be awarded as meetings with the Star Awards 2009 Committee have not been held yet. MediaCorp does not rule out future collaborations with her on a project basis.

Huang was initially offered a role in the 2008 MediaCorp mega-blockbuster drama series, The Little Nyonya. As she decided not to renew her contract, the role was offered to Xiang Yun instead.

On 31 October 2008, MediaCorp confirmed Huang would be receiving the coveted All-Time Favourite Artiste Award at the Star Awards 2009.

On 1 November 2008, Huang answered her supporters' queries if she would make a comeback, through telling reporters she has rejected some invitations from the TV Station to film dramas on a project basis. Biren was quoted as telling Shin Min Daily,

If I were to come back, the most important conditions are (quality of) the script, role, how much time is needed for filming, and my husband's support. Money isn't a problem. 

Huang was featured in the Straits Times Life! Monday Interview published on 3 November 2008. In the interview, she talked about life in her younger days, career, family and chances of making a comeback. In the interview, she mentioned that she is "already fielding offers from production houses as well as theatre companies, though she has not accepted any yet", as she has to take care of her two children.

On 20 January 2009, Huang made a public appearance where she attended the gala premiere of local movie Love Matters.

Huang was awarded the All Time Favourite Artiste Award at the Star Awards 2009 ceremony held on 26 April 2009. The award was presented to her by Singapore's President, Sellapan Ramanathan. (Click on the reference link to see her receiving the coveted award at the ceremony)

After leaving the industry, Huang continued to take up numerous endorsement engagements. These include being a spokesperson for OCBC Bank's SmartSenior Programme. She filmed a TV advertisement for the bank, which also featured her mother.

In January 2010, she filmed a one-minute TV advertisement for L'Oréal Paris Revitalift Face Cream. In the same year, she also endorsed Ginvera Grorich Anti-Dandruff Shampoo. A television commercial was filmed and advertisements were also published in numerous print media. Biren was then appointed ambassador of slimming company BeauteHub in February 2011.

Huang made a public appearance at the annual Star Awards 2011 ceremony (Show 1) as guest presenter on 17 April 2011.

In June 2011, Huang was interviewed by LiveWell magazine. She said it was her dream to film a movie and she has plans to do so in the future if there is a chance.Her last drama with Mediacorp was Mars VS Venus.

Huang announced plans to return to television when she attended the Star Awards 2012 award ceremony as award presenter alongside Member of Parliament Baey Yam Keng. She revealed that discussions with MediaCorp are underway and she might star in a drama in 2013.

Return to entertainment industry
In an interview with local magazine i-Weekly in March 2013, Huang revealed that MediaCorp will continue to represent her in terms of artiste management and sourcing for ad hoc jobs which are of a more flexible nature.

After a six-year hiatus, she was slated to star in the TV station's 2013 mega-blockbuster year end series The Journey: A Voyage alongside Li Nanxing, Jeanette Aw and Elvin Ng. Her return to drama was much anticipated by the audience, but she had to turn down the lead role just weeks before filming commenced because a painful 10 cm cyst had grown in her kidney. She underwent surgery in April 2013 and required time to recuperate. She described her decision to pull out of the series as "regrettable" but she felt her state of health was most important, and filming in Malaysia and Tangshan, China might affect her scheduled medical follow-ups. Carole Lin has since taken on the role.

On 23 March 2014, Huang mentioned she has since made a full recovery from the surgery and will be making a television comeback in the second half of the year. However, she declined to provide details as discussions with the TV station were still ongoing. On 31 March 2014, MediaCorp TV Channel 8 announced on its official Facebook page that Biren will be making a comeback with two dramas in the works. Huang will star as a supportive wife of a down-and-out man opposite Thomas Ong in the serial Three Wishes which is slated to air in October 2014. She will then play the titular character in 2015 drama Tiger Mum, a disciplinarian figure who gels the family together.

Audience response to Huang's comeback has been largely favourable, with the viewership of her comeback drama Three Wishes breaking the 1 million mark on its debut episode, a phenomenon rarely seen for local dramas. The captivating storyline, coupled with audience strong anticipation towards Huang's return, were cited as contributory factors towards the drama's strong showing. The finale episode attracted more than 1.1 million viewers, with ratings peaking at a record-breaking high of 1,134,000 viewers – propelling the drama to clinch Top Rated Drama for Year 2014.

On 30 December 2014, it was revealed that she will star alongside Zoe Tay, Rui En, Jeanette Aw, Li Nanxing and Qi Yuwu in MediaCorp Channel 8's 2015 year-end mega blockbuster series, The Dream Makers II. The serial would be her first collaboration with Tay in 27 years.

Both of Huang's 2015 drama serials, Tiger Mum and The Dream Makers ll clinched the Top Rated Drama and Best Drama Serial awards respectively at the Star Awards 2016 ceremony held on 24 April 2016.

Personal life
Often nicknamed Ling by relatives, Huang has one older sister and one younger brother. She studied at Mayflower Primary School and Mayflower Secondary School, where she developed a keen interest in oratorical and storytelling contests. She then completed her GCE Advanced Level examinations at Ang Mo Kio Secondary School (Pre-U Centre).

In 1996, Huang married Adrian Quek, a Senior Assistant Commissioner of the Singapore Police Force, after dating him for two years. The couple have a son born on 10 March 2000. On 30 July 2007, Huang announced that she was two months pregnant with her second child, a girl due in March 2008. On 6 March 2008, Huang gave birth to her second child, one day before her own birthday at Thomson Medical Centre. The birth was described by Huang as extremely smooth.

On 9 February 2009, Huang's father died due to a viral infection at the age of 67.

On 29 September 2009, during the wedding ceremony of MediaCorp artistes Fann Wong and Christopher Lee where she was one of the invited guests, Huang told reporters she was two-and-a-half months pregnant with her third child. The pregnancy was unplanned and the baby is expected to be born in April 2010. In February 2010, Huang commented that her third pregnancy was a tough one when she was interviewed by The New Paper. She had an extreme case of severe morning sickness where she had to take medication to prevent herself from throwing up in the first trimester. Huang also feels more tired compared to her second pregnancy mainly because taking care of Janessa (her second child) takes up a lot of her energy. She gave birth to her baby girl, Janelle, on 29 April 2010.

Huang is the aunt of Singapore National fencing athlete, Jet Ng.

Huang lists Chen Hanwei, Zoe Tay, Pan Lingling and ex-actress Magdeline Chu as her closest friends in the industry. She also revealed she feels most at ease while working with ex-actor Xie Shaoguang because they have very good chemistry on screen, though they seldom keep in contact in private.

Addressed affectionately as ‘'Biren-jie'’ (碧仁姐) by numerous artistes of the younger generation, Huang is also widely seen as a role model to artistes such as Jeanette Aw, Felicia Chin, Zhang Yao Dong, Zhou Ying and Ya Hui, among many others. Aw described Huang as her favourite local actress and admires her professionalism; Chin respects Huang for her vast experience and acting skills; Zhang and Zhou both regard her as a mentor while Ya Hui lists Huang as one of her inspirations.

Filmography

Television

Variety shows

Discography

Compilation album

Awards and nominations

References

External links
Huang Biren fun's forum

Living people
1969 births
Singaporean television personalities
Singaporean television actresses
Singaporean people of Hokkien descent
Singaporean Roman Catholics
20th-century Singaporean actresses
21st-century Singaporean actresses